The 2016 South Africa Sevens was the second tournament within the 2016–17 World Rugby Sevens Series and the eighteenth edition of the South Africa Sevens. It was held over the weekend of 10–11 December 2016 at Cape Town Stadium in Cape Town, South Africa.

Format
The teams were drawn into four pools of four teams each, with each team playing every other team in their pool once. The top two teams from each pool advanced to the Cup/5th place brackets. The bottom two teams from each group went to the Challenge trophy/13th place brackets.

Teams
Fifteen core teams participated in the tournament along with one invited team, which was the winner of the 2016 Africa Cup Sevens, Uganda:

Pool Stage

Pool A

Pool B

Pool C

Pool D

Knockout stage

13th place

Challenge trophy

5th place

Cup

Tournament placings

Source: World Rugby (archived)

References

External links
World Rugby Sevens Series website

South Africa Sevens
South Africa Sevens
2016 in South African sport